This is a list of awards and nominations received by Xuxa a Brazilian singer, TV host and actress. She began her career in 1985 in PolyGram with álbum Xuxa e Seus Amigos, and has been the most popular Latin acts in the world since the mid-1980s. Xuxa has sold 50 million records worldwide. Becoming one of Latin singers who sold more albums in the 20th century, winning several awards including 2 Latin Grammy Awards.

In 1990, Xuxa won the Queen's Award Viña del Mar Festival. In 1992 won two categories of the 5th Prêmio da Música Brasileira, including best children's album. In 2000, Xuxa won the award Gaviota de Plata, at the Viña del Mar International Song Festival.

In 2000 she released a series of DVDs named Xuxa Só Para Baixinhos (Xuxa Only for Little Ones), with Xuxa singing children's songs and dancing in a choreography that small children could easily duplicate. It was the first of a successful series that won the Latin Grammy Award for Best Children's Album in 2002 and 2003 in addition to being nominated for the same award in 2004, 2006, 2012 and 2013.

As an actress, Xuxa was honored at the 37th Annual Gramado Film Festival with a "Kikito" by its more than 16 children's films throughout his career. On television, Xuxa won several awards, including a nomination Daytime Emmy Awards for TV series Xuxa in 1994. With Xou da Xuxa won six times in a row the Troféu Imprensa for best children's show, in 1995, 1998, 1999 won award for Xuxa Park, and in 2007 for TV Xuxa. In 2010 she was honored in Miami with the Brazilian International Press Award for his contribution to children's programming. In the same year received an honorary award at the 14th Prêmio Extra de Televisão, presented annually by the newspaper Extra. In 2013 was awarded at the 52nd Troféu Imprensa as best host or entertainer TV.

For his philanthropic work, Xuxa honored in 2008 by Albert II, Prince of Monaco, for services rendered to society through its Fundação Xuxa Meneghel. In September 2011, she and Shakira came together through their charitable foundations to help to children under six years of the poorest communities in Brazil. The two artists and Brazilian government officials signed an agreement of cooperation in the city of Rio de Janeiro, that in their first four years intend "improve education' for children of 100 educational centers in Brazil. In 2015, the Foundation was honored in Miami during the BrazilFoundation Gala.

Audrey Hepburn Humanitarian Award 
The Audrey Hepburn Humanitarian Award recognizes individuals and organizations who have made extraordinary contributions on behalf of children through advocacy, volunteer work, philanthropic efforts, educational and innovative community-based programs.

|-
| align="center"|1995
| align="center"| Xuxa
| align="center"|Humanitarian Award
|
|-

Brazilian Press Awards 
Created in 1997 by journalist and producer Carlos Borges, the Brazilian International PRESS AWARDS became the largest Brazilian event outside Brazil.

|-
| align="center"|2010
| align="center"| Xuxa
| align="center"|Personality
|
|-

Cinema Brazil Grand Prize 
The Grande Prêmio do Cinema Brasileiro is a Brazilian film award. It was established in 2000 as Grande Prêmio Cinema Brasil by the Ministry of Culture of Brazil that presented it in 2000 and 2001. In 2002, the newly established Academia Brasileira de Cinema taken on the role of delivering the award which was renamed to Grande Prêmio do Cinema Brasileiro.

|-
| align="center"|2010
| align="center"|"Xuxa em O Mistério de Feiurinha"
| align="center"|Best Children's Feature Film
|
|-

Daytime Emmy Awards 
The Daytime Emmy Award is an American accolade bestowed by the New York–based National Academy of Television Arts and Sciences and the Los Angeles–based Academy of Television Arts & Sciences in recognition of excellence in American daytime television programming.

|-
| align="center"|1994
| align="center"|"Xuxa"
| align="center"|Outstanding Achievement in Art Direction/Set Decoration/Scenic Design
|
|-

Festival de Gramado 
The Gramado Film Festival (Portuguese: Festival de Gramado) is an international film festival held annually in the Brazilian city of Gramado, Rio Grande do Sul, since 1973. Since 1992 it also gives awards to Latin American films produced outside Brazil. It is the biggest film festival in the country.

|-
| align="center"|2009
| align="center"| Xuxa
| Kikito
|
|-

Latin Grammy Awards
The Latin Grammy Award is an award by The Latin Academy of Recording Arts & Sciences to recognize outstanding achievement in the Latin music industry. Xuxa has received two awards from six nominations.

|-
| align="center"|2002
| align="center"|"Só para Baixinhos Vol.2"
| rowspan="6" align="center"|Best Latin Children's Album
|
|-
| align="center"|2003
| align="center"|"Só para Baixinhos Vol.3 - Country"
|
|-
|-
| align="center"|2004
| align="center"| "Só para Baixinhos Vol.4 - Praia"
|
|-
| align="center"|2006
| align="center"| "Só para Baixinhos Vol.6 - Festa"
|
|-
| align="center"|2012
| align="center"| "Só para Baixinhos Vol. 11 - Sustentabilidade"
|
|-
| align="center"|2013
| align="center"| "Só para Baixinhos Vol. 12 - É Pra Dançar"
|
|-

Martín Fierro Awards 
The Martín Fierro Awards (Spanish: Premios Martín Fierro) is the name of the most prominent awards for Argentine radio and television, granted by APTRA, the Association of Argentine Television and Radio Journalists.

|-
| align="center"|1992
| align="center"|"El Show de Xuxa"
| align="center"|Best Children's Program
|
|-

Order Associative of Monaco 
Order Associative of Monaco is presented during the Gala Night of Associations in Monaco. The award is the highest distinction awarded to personalities who excel in the philanthropic area.

|-
| align="center"|2008
| align="center"|"Fundação Xuxa Meneghel"
| Order Associative of Monaco
|
|-

Premio Lo Nuestro 
The Lo Nuestro Awards or Premios Lo Nuestro (Spanish for "Our Thing") is a Spanish-language awards show honoring the best of Latin music.

|-
| align="center"|1990
| align="center"|Xuxa
|Pop New Artist of the Year 
|
|-

Prêmio Extra de Televisão 
The Prêmio Extra de Televisão (English: Extra Awards Television) has been conducted since 1998 by the newspaper Extra, rewarding the best of Brazilian television.

|-
| align="center"|2010
| align="center"|Xuxa
| Personality
|
|-

Prêmio da Música Brasileira 
The Prêmio da Música Brasileira (English: Award of Brazilian Music) is an award that honors since 1987 the best of Brazilian popular music.

|-
|  rowspan="2" align="center"|1992
| align="center"|"Xou da Xuxa Sete"
| Best children's album
|
|-
| align="center"|"A Voz dos Animais"
| Best children's song
|
|-

Prêmio QUEM 
The Prêmio QUEM is given by Quem Magazine published in Brazil by Editora Globo.

|-
| align="center"|2011
| align="center"| Xuxa
| Personality
|
|-

Troféu Imprensa 
The Troféu Imprensa/Troféu Internet, are presented annually by SBT, to honor the best Brazilian television productions, including telenovelas.

|-
| align="center"|1987
| rowspan="7" align="center"| "Xou da Xuxa"
| rowspan="21" align="center"| Best children's program
|
|-
|-
| align="center"|1988
|
|-
| align="center"|1989
|
|-
| align="center"|1990
|
|-
| align="center"|1991
|
|-
| align="center"|1992
|
|-
| align="center"|1993
|
|-
| align="center"|1995
| rowspan="7" align="center"|"Xuxa Park"
|
|-
| align="center"|1996
|
|-
| align="center"|1997
|
|-
| align="center"|1998
|
|-
| align="center"|1999
|
|-
| align="center"|2000
|
|-
| align="center"|2001
|
|-
| align="center"|2003
| rowspan="3" align="center"|"Xuxa no Mundo da Imaginação"
|
|-
| align="center"|2004
|
|-
| align="center"|2005
|
|-
| align="center"|2007
| rowspan="4" align="center"|"TV Xuxa"
|
|-
| align="center"|2008
|
|-
| align="center"|2009
|
|-
| align="center"|2010
|
|-
| align="center"|2013
| align="center"|Xuxa
| align="center"|Best host or entertainer TV
|
|-
| align="center"|2016
| align="center"|"Xuxa Meneghel"
| align="center"|Best TV host
|
|-

Viña del Mar International Song Festival 
The Viña del Mar International Song Festival (Spanish: Festival Internacional de la Canción de Viña del Mar) is a music festival that is considered the best and biggest in Latin America and the most important musical event in the Americas.

|-
| align="center"|1990
| rowspan="2" align="center"| Xuxa
| Festival Queen
|
|-
| align="center"|2000
| Gaivota de Prata
|
|-

References

External links
 Official Website

Awards
Xuxa